Johann Leonhard Dober (born March 7, 1706, Mönchsroth, Swabia, Germany to Johann Dober and Anna Barbara Link; died April 1, 1766, Herrnhut, Saxony, Germany) was, along with David Nitschmann, one of the two first missionaries of the Moravian Brethren (Herrnhuter Brüdergemeine) in the West Indies in 1732.

Early Years in Germany 
Dober learned the trade of pottery from his father. He was converted at age 17 while visiting the Moravian church at Herrnhut. On July 24, 1731, he heard a talk given by Count Nikolaus Ludwig Zinzendorf about missions to the slaves of the Caribbean. In his talk, Zinzendorf described a former slave from the Danish island of St. Thomas named Anthony Ulrich, who believed that the slaves would be very receptive to Christian missionaries. Dober, along with his friend Tobias Leupold, felt called to go to the Caribbean, and they began to prepare for this work. Although they initially met with opposition from the Moravian Brethren, the doubts were eventually settled by drawing lots. Dober's lot read, "Let the lad go, for the Lord is with him," but Leupold's said that he must wait. Instead, David Nitschmann was chosen to go with Dober to help start the Caribbean mission.

Mission in St. Thomas 
On August 20, 1732, Count Zinzendorf blessed the two young men, and after a prayer meeting sent them on to Copenhagen, where they were to find a ship bound for St. Thomas. In Copenhagen, they again met with opposition to their plans. Even Anthony Ulrich, who had originally proposed the idea, began to have second thoughts. Von Plesz, the King’s Chamberlain, asked them how they would live.

“We shall work,” replied Nitschmann, “as slaves among the slaves.”

“But,” said Von Plesz, “that is impossible. It will not be allowed. No white man ever works as a slave.”

“Very well,” replied Nitschmann, “I am a carpenter, and will ply my trade.”

“But what will the potter do?”

“He will help me in my work.”

“If you go on like that,” exclaimed the Chamberlain, “you will stand your ground the wide world over.”

Although the Danish West Indian Company refused to grant them passage, the two men eventually found sympathy at the Danish court, and with the help of a court officer they obtained berths on a ship bound for the West Indies. Leaving Copenhagen on Oct 8, 1732, they arrived in St. Thomas two months later on December 13. While in St. Thomas, they lived frugally and preached to the slaves, and they had a certain amount of success. Dober returned to Germany in 1734 (David Nitschmann had only gone to help Dober get settled and had left after only a few weeks), but other Moravian missionaries continued the work for fifty years afterward, establishing churches on St. Thomas, St. Croix, St. John’s, Jamaica, Antigua, Barbados, and St. Kitts. Moravian missionaries baptized 13,000 converts before any other missionaries arrived on the scene.

Later Years 
Dober returned to Europe since he had been chosen to serve as Chief Elder of the Moravian Brethren.  As the work began to spread across the world, he realized that he could not do the job any more and it was his 1741 offer to resign that occasioned the Moravian Unity's realization that Jesus Christ is the only Head and Chief Elder of the Church. He married Anna Schindler on July 13, 1738, but she died during childbirth on December 12, 1739. In 1743 he remarried, this time to Anna Gertrude Engel. Thereafter he was consecrated a bishop, and served in Livonia from 1745. Throughout this period he made several trips to England, Holland, and Silesia. After Count Zinzendorf died in 1760, he returned to Herrnhut, where he served on the directing board of the Moravian Brethren and spent his last years. He died on April 1, 1766 and was buried in God's Acre, the community's graveyard on the Hutberg Hill in Herrnhut, Saxony, Germany.

The Story of the Moravian Slaves 

A popular misconception is that Dober and Nitschmann sold themselves into slavery in order to gain access to the African slaves of St. Thomas. In fact, although they expressed willingness to do this, white slavery was not allowed in any of the West Indian islands, so they plied their individual trades to support themselves. However, there is a story preserved by Bonnie Bartonin her book The Bow in the Cloud: or, The Negro's Memorial (1834) about Leonard Dober where she says,

References

External links
The Christian Treasury: Containing Contributions from Ministers and Members of Various Evangelical Denominations, pages 438-442
The Missions of the Church of the United Brethren, pages 241-246

German Protestant missionaries
1706 births
1766 deaths
Protestant missionaries in the United States Virgin Islands
German people of the Moravian Church